Jean Parmentier (1494–1529), born in Dieppe, France, was a navigator, cartographer, and poet. Jean and his brother Raoul made numerous voyages for the shipowner Jean Ango.

In 1531 Pierre Crignon, published a collection of Jean's poetry. Although Jean was well known as a cartographer, none of his maps have survived.

In their voyages he supposedly was accompanied by "Jean Sasi, le grand Peintre". Upon their return they triggered the development of the Dieppe maps, influencing the work of Dieppe cartographers, such as Jean Rotz.

Works
 Journal du voyage de Jean Parmentier, de Dieppe, à l'Ile de Sumatra en l'année 1529

Notes

See also
France-Asia relations

1494 births
1529 deaths
People from Dieppe, Seine-Maritime
French explorers
French exploration in the Age of Discovery